Hajime Yoshimura (born 27 January 1939) is a Japanese biathlete. He competed in the 20 km individual event at the 1968 Winter Olympics.

References

1939 births
Living people
Japanese male biathletes
Olympic biathletes of Japan
Biathletes at the 1968 Winter Olympics
Sportspeople from Hokkaido